Firuz Bobiev (born 18 June 1986) is a Tajikistani footballer who is last known to have played as a midfielder for CSKA (Dushanbe).

Career

Bobiev started his career with Moldovan side Academia, where he made 6 league appearances and scored 0 goals. On 25 July 2009, Bobiev debuted for Academia during a 2–1 win over Nistru. Before the 2011 season, he signed for Istiklol in Tajikistan, helping them win the league.

In 2012, he signed for Moldovan club Speranța (Crihana Veche). Before the 2015 season, Bobiev signed for Khujand in Tajikistan.

References

External links
 

1986 births
Association football midfielders
CSKA Pamir Dushanbe players
Expatriate footballers in Moldova
FC Academia Chișinău players
FC Istiklol players
FC Sfîntul Gheorghe players
FC Speranța Crihana Veche players
FK Khujand players
Gagauziya-Oguzsport players
Living people
Moldovan Super Liga players
Tajikistan Higher League players
Tajikistani expatriate footballers
Tajikistani footballers
Sportspeople from Dushanbe